Luhmann or Lühmann is a surname. Notable people with the name include:

 Heinrich Luhmann (1890–1978), German author who wrote about the Kirchhundem region
 Jörg Lühmann, German Green Party politician
 Kirsten Lühmann (born 1964), German politician
 Niklas Luhmann (1927–1998), German sociologist
 Wendy Luhmann, one of the 1982 doubles champions in the NCAA Women's Division II Tennis Championship

See also
 8808 Luhmann, an outer main-belt asteroid